Võlla is a village in Muhu Parish, Saare County in western Estonia.

Russian general Friedrich Wilhelm von Buxhoeveden (1750–1811) was born in Võlla Manor.

References

Villages in Saare County